Foxy Lady is a studio album released by Chinese pop/rock group Hang on the Box.

Track listing

Personnel 
Wang Yue – vocals
Yang Fan – guitar
Yilina – bass 
Shen Jing – drums

References
Foxy Lady album
Extracts on MySpace.com
Sister Benten Records Online

2004 albums
Hang on the Box albums